Vayer is a surname. Notable people with the surname include:

Adam Vayer (born 1987), Israeli footballer currently playing for Maccabi Ironi Kiryat Ata
François de La Mothe Le Vayer (1588–1672), French writer who was known to use the pseudonym Orosius Tubero
Gábor Vayer (born 1977), Hungarian football player who currently plays for Paksi SE